Copenhagen Business Academy, also known as Cphbusiness, is a school of higher education in Copenhagen, Denmark. The academy is an independent self-owning institution subordinated to the Ministry of Science, Innovation and Higher Education. Degree programmes offered are mainly applied degrees, especially in business, finance, service management, IT and biotechnical science. The academy grants undergraduate and academic degrees but not master's or doctoral degrees. In addition to full-time studies the academy offers supplemental education, part-time programmes at bachelor's level and short-term courses for people who need to strengthen their qualifications. The academy is one of the largest business academies in Denmark. The academy has 4.800 full-time students and 5.800 part-time students and about 350 employees.

History
Copenhagen Business Academy was founded in 2009 and initially offered higher education programmes in cooperation with Niels Brock Copenhagen Business College, Copenhagen North, Copenhagen Hospitality College and the Academy of Chemical and Biotechnical Science. In August 2012, these higher education programmes were officially transferred from the four schools to the administration of Copenhagen Business Academy.

Campuses

Cphbusiness City
Cphbusiness City on Landemærket (No. 11) is the headquarters of Copenhagen Business Academy and houses the administration and management of the school, as well as a library and various programmes within financial management that are offered in Danish. It has a total of 950 full-time students and 50 faculty.

The building was originally constructed for De Forenede Protokolfabrikker A/S in 1940. The campus opened in the summer of 2012 after extensive refurbishment of the building.

Cphbusiness Nørrebro
Cphbusiness Nørrebro, located at Blågårdsgade 23b, houses study programmes within the area of Service and Experience and has a total of 500 full-time students and 20 faculty members. The building is a former factory located in the Blågårds Plads area of Nørrebro.

Cphbusiness Søerne
campus Cphbusiness Søerne in Nansensgade (No. 19) is located close to The Lakes in central Copenhagen. It houses the academy's study programmes within the fields of Sales and Marketing, Management, Communications and will also be home to many of the part-time AP-Degree and Diploma Programmes. Cphbusiness Søerne has a total of 1,000 full-time students and 50 lecturers.

Cphbusiness Lyngby
The campus in Kongens Lyngby is situated 12 km north of central Copenhagen. The current buildings were inaugurated in 2013 and 2014. The campus houses 17 different full-time study programmes with a total of 1,500 Danish and international full-time students and 70 faculty members.

Cphbusiness Hillerød
Cphbusiness Hillerød is located in Hillerød in North Zealand. The campus houses biotechnical and chemical study programmes and collaborates closely with the large medical companies that reside in the area such as Novo Nordisk and Biogen. The campus has approximately 100 students and 10 lecturers.

Programmes

Academy Profession Degree Programme
 Computer Science (Datamatiker)
 Information & Communication Technology (Akademiuddannelsen i IT)
 Marketing Management (Markedsføringsøkonom)
 Multimedia Design and Communication
 Service, Hospitality and Tourism Management (Serviceøkonom)

Bachelor's degrees 
 Innovation and Entrepreneurship
 International Hospitality Management
 International Sales and Marketing Management
  Software Development 
 Sport Management 
 Web Development

See also
 KEA – Copenhagen School of Design and Technology
 Zealand Institute of Business and Technology

References

External links
 Official website
 Profile on the Education Guide website of the Danish Ministry of Science, Innovation and Higher Education
 Translations of Danish educational terms through proclamations of the Ministry of Science, Innovation and Higher Education

Higher education in Copenhagen
Educational institutions established in 2009
2009 establishments in Denmark